The 2013 Asian Airgun Championships along with 25 m and 50 m Rifle and Pistol were held at Azadi Sport Complex, Tehran, Iran between 18 and 26 October 2013.

Medal summary

Men

Women

Medal table

References 
General
 ISSF Results Overview

Specific

External links 
 Official Results

Asian Shooting Championships
Asian
Shooting
2013 in Iranian sport
Shooting competitions in Iran